Akash Singh( Screen name Akash Singh Yadav); is an Indian actor who works in Bhojpuri cinema, Hindi cinema  and Bengali cinema and theatre.

Early life 
Singh was born at Mumbai in 1987. His parents are Bhojpuri actor Kunal Singh and Bengali actress Arati Bhattacharya. After completing his college education from MMK College of Commerce and Economics, Mumbai he took up his acting career.

Acting in feature films 
His first movie Onde Ondu Sari was a Kannada movie.  His second movie  Bloody Isshq was released on 1 March 2013, The film was made under Aashawari Media Pvt Ltd. After the success of the film he migrated to Bhojpuri cinema. He is also works as a singer in several hindi and Bengali movies.

Selected filmography 
 Onde Ondu Sari (Kannada)2011 
 Achena Prem (Bengali)2011 (actor)
Hari Om Hari  (Oriya) 2013
 Sweetheart (Bengali,Telugu) (actor, Director Writer) 2013
 Mr Rajesh (Telugu) 2013
 Bloody Isshq (Hindi) 2013
 Action (Bengali) (Musician) 2014
 Masoom (Bengali) 2014
 Tere Jaisa Yaar Kahan (2017)
 Bhauji Pataniya  (Bhojpuri) (2018)
 Chor Police (Bhojpuri) (2019)
 Drive (Singer)(2019)
 Aankh Micholi (2021)

References 

1987 births
21st-century Indian actors
Male actors in Bhojpuri cinema
Living people